The 33rd Regiment Indiana Infantry was an infantry regiment that served in the Union Army during the American Civil War.

Service
The 33rd Indiana Infantry was organized at Indianapolis, Indiana and mustered in for a three-year enlistment on September 16, 1861, under the command of Colonel John Coburn.

The regiment was attached to Attached to Thomas' Command, Army of the Ohio, to November 1861. 1st Brigade, Army of the Ohio, to December 1861. 1st Brigade, 1st Division, Army of the Ohio, to February 1862. 27th Brigade, 7th Division, Army of the Ohio, to October 1862. 1st Brigade, 3rd Division, Army of Kentucky, Department of the Ohio, to February 1863. Coburn's Brigade, Baird's Division, Army of Kentucky, Department of the Cumberland, to June 1863. 3rd Brigade, 1st Division, Reserve Corps, Army of the Cumberland, to October 1863. Coburn's Brigade, Post of Murfreesboro, Tennessee, Department of the Cumberland, to January 1864. 2nd Brigade, 1st Division, XI Corps, Army of the Cumberland, to April 1864. 2nd Brigade, 3rd Division, XX Corps, Army of the Cumberland, to July 1865.

The 33rd Indiana Infantry mustered out of service July 21, 1865, at Louisville, Kentucky.

Detailed service

Moved to Louisville, Kentucky, September 28, then to Camp Dick Robinson, Kentucky, and duty there until October 13. Moved to Camp Wildcat, Kentucky, October 13, 1861. Action at Camp Wildcat, October 21. At Crab Orchard, Kentucky, November 15, 1861 to January 3, 1862. Operations about Mill Springs and Somerset, Kentucky, December 1–13, 1861. At Lexington, Kentucky, January 3 to April 11, 1862. Cumberland Gap Campaign March 28-June 18. Occupation of Cumberland Gap June 18 to September 17. Retreat to the Ohio River September 17-October 3. Duty at Covington, Lexington, Nicholasville, and Danville, Kentucky, until January 26, 1863. Moved to Louisville, Kentucky, then to Nashville, Tennessee, January 26-February 7. Moved to Franklin February 21. Action at Franklin March 4. Battle of Thompson's Station March 4–5. Most of the regiment captured by Van Dorn's forces nearly 18,000 strong. Exchanged May 5, 1863. Brentwood March 25 (detachment). Tullahoma Campaign June 23-July 7. Duty at Guy's Gap and Murfreesboro until September 5. At Manchester, Esuntil Springs, Cowan, Dechard, Tracy City, Christiana City, and along Nashville & Chattanooga Railroad until April 1864. Regiment reenlisted at Christiana City, January 1864. On veteran furlough February and March. Atlanta Campaign May 1-September 8. Demonstrations on Rocky Faced Ridge May 8–11. Battle of Resaca May 14–15. Cassville May 19. Advance on Dallas May 22–25. New Hope Church May 25. Operations on line of Pumpkin Vine Creek and battles about Dallas, New Hope Church, and Allatoona Hills May 25-June 5. Operations about Marietta and against Kennesaw Mountain June 10-July 2. Pine Hill June 11–14. Lost Mountain June 15–17. Gilgal or Golgotha Church June 15. Muddy Creek June 17. Noyes Creek June 19. Kolb's Farm June 22. Assault on Kennesaw June 27. Ruff's Station, Smyrna Camp Ground, July 4. Chattahoochee River July 5–17. Peachtree Creek July 19–20. Siege of Atlanta July 22-August 25. Operations at Chattahoochee River Bridge August 26-September 2. Occupation of Atlanta September 2-November 15. McDonough Road near Atlanta November 6. March to the Sea November 15-December 10. Siege of Savannah December 10–21. Carolinas Campaign January–April 1865. Lawtonville, South Carolina, February 2. Fayetteville, North Carolina, March 11. Averysboro March 16. Battle of Bentonville March 19–21. Occupation of Goldsboro March 24. Advance on Raleigh April 10–14. Occupation of Raleigh April 14. Bennett's House April 26. Surrender of Johnston and his army. March to Washington, D.C., via Richmond, Virginia, April 29-May 20. Grand Review of the Armies May 24. Ordered to Louisville, Kentucky in June and duty there until July 21.

Casualties
The regiment lost a total of 298 men during service; 4 officers and 112 enlisted men killed or mortally wounded, 2 officers and 180 enlisted men died of disease.

At the Battle of Thompson's Station, March 5th, 1863, losses were 13 killed, 85 wounded, 407 captured, total 505.

Commanders
 Colonel John Coburn
 Colonel James Ellis Burton

See also

 List of Indiana Civil War regiments
 Indiana in the Civil War

References
 Butler, Scot. Affectionately Yours: The Civil War Home Front Letters of the Ovid Butler Family (Indianapolis: Indiana Historical Society Press), 2004. 
 Dyer, Frederick H. A Compendium of the War of the Rebellion (Des Moines, IA: Dyer Pub. Co.), 1908.
 McBride, John R. History of the Thirty-Third Indiana Veteran Volunteer Infantry During the Four Years of Civil War, from Sept. 16, 1861, to July 21, 1865 (Indianapolis: W. B. Burford), 1900.
 Welcher, Frank Johnson & Larry G. Liggett. Coburn's Brigade: The 85th Indiana, 33rd Indiana, 19th Michigan, and 22nd Wisconsin in the Western Civil War (Carmel, IN: Guild Press of Indiana), 1999. 
Attribution

External links
 Roster of the 33rd Indiana Infantry

Military units and formations established in 1861
Military units and formations disestablished in 1865
Units and formations of the Union Army from Indiana
1861 establishments in Indiana